Mount Edred is a prominent ice-covered mountain,  high, which stands  inland from George VI Sound, lies about  north of Galileo Cliffs, and marks the southern limit of the Douglas Range on Alexander Island, Antarctica. It was first photographed from the air on November 23, 1935 by Lincoln Ellsworth and mapped from these photos by W.L.G. Joerg. Its east side was roughly surveyed in 1936 by the British Graham Land Expedition and resurveyed in 1949 by the Falkland Islands Dependencies Survey (FIDS). It was named by the FIDS for Edred, a Saxon king of England in the 10th century. The west face of the mountain was mapped from air photos taken by the Ronne Antarctic Research Expedition, 1947–48, by D. Searle of the FIDS in 1960. Mount Edred is the ninth highest peak of Alexander Island, succeeded by Mount Calais and proceeded by Mount Spivey.

See also 
 Mount Ethelwulf
 Mount Ethelred
 Mount Athelstan

Further reading 
 Damien Gildea, Antarctic Peninsula - Mountaineering in Antarctica: Travel Guide

External links 

 Mount Edred on USGS website
 Mount Edred on AADC website
 Mount Edred on SCAR website
 Mount Edred on peakbagger website
 Mount Edred on peakery website
 Mount Edred updated long term weather forecast

References 

Mountains of Alexander Island